Lehendakaritza or the President's Office is the department of the Basque Government responsible for the affairs of the lehendakari and issues like communication, open government, foreign affairs and peace. This department is led by the President.

The seat of the President's Office is in Vitoria-Gasteiz, near the official residence of the lehendakari, Ajuria Enea.

Structure 
 President of the Government
 Secretary-General of the President's Office
 Secretary-General of Foreign Action
 Secretary-General for Peace and Coexistance

External links 
 Official website 

Basque Government